HMS Flamborough was a member of the standardize 20-gun sixth rates built at the end of the 17th Century. She was commissioned for service in Home waters, then Mediterranean. She was captured by the French in 1705 and scuttled.

Flamborough was the first ship to bear this name in the Royal Navy.

Construction
She was ordered in the Fourth Batch of four ships from Chatham Dockyard to be built under the guidance of their Master Shipwright, Robert Lee. She was launched on 10 July 1697.

Commissioned Service
She was commissione on 28 June 1697 under Captain Robert Hughes, RN. She escorted the White Sea convoy in 1698. In 1699 she patrolled Irish waters.in 1701 she was assigned to the Yarmouth fishery. She was with Rooke's Fleet in 1702. Captain Josiah Mighells, RN became her commander on 31 March 1703 assigned to Shovell's fleet and went to the Medierranean. 1705 her commander was Captain John Hooper, RN.

Loss
HMS Flamborough was captured by the French 50-gun Le Jason off Cape Spartel, Morocco on 10 October 1705 and scuttled.

Citations

References
 Winfield, British Warships in the Age of Sail (1603 – 1714), by Rif Winfield, published by Seaforth Publishing, England © 2009, EPUB , Chapter 6, The Sixth Rates, Vessels acquired from 18 December 1688, Sixth Rates of 20 guns and up to 26 guns, Maidstone Group, Flamborough
 Colledge, Ships of the Royal Navy, by J.J. Colledge, revised and updated by Lt Cdr Ben Warlow and Steve Bush, published by Seaforth Publishing, Barnsley, Great Britain, © 2020, e  (EPUB), Section F (Flamborough)

 

1690s ships
Corvettes of the Royal Navy
Ships built in Chatham
Naval ships of the United Kingdom